The 1972 Akron Zips football team represented Akron University in the 1972 NCAA College Division football season as an independent. The team was led by 12th-year head coach Gordon K. Larson, in his final season. The Zips played their home games at the Rubber Bowl in Akron, Ohio, finished the season with a record of 3–4–2, and outscored their opponents 193–148.

Schedule

References

Akron
Akron Zips football seasons
Akron Zips football